MARC USA is a privately held United States-based advertising agency with more than $350 million in billings and 250 employees. MARC USA operates full-service offices in Chicago, Illinois, Boston, Massachusetts and Pittsburgh. MARC USA also partners with MARCA Hispanic in Miami, Florida.

Clients include Rite Aid, True Value Hardware, Cooper Tire & Rubber Company, and Pennsylvania Lottery  MARC USA is headquartered in Pittsburgh, Pennsylvania.

It has done pro-bono campaigns for the Andy Warhol Museum and Pittsburgh Opera.

Management
 Tony Bucci - Chairman
 Cari Bucci - President
 Dave Buklarewicz - Executive Media Director
 TJ Crawford - Digital Strategy, MarTech and Analytic Solutions Director
 Amy Nixon - Strategy Director
 Jon Galatis - Group Account Director
 Matt Sullivan - Group Creative Director
 Josh Blasingame - Group Creative Director
 Karen Leitze - Research Director
 Josh Magcarty - Director of Analytics and Data Science
 Jenny Brenner - Associate Director
 Jerry Thompson - Public Relations Director
 Patti Mulligan - Director of Digital Delivery
 Barbara Stefanis-Israel - Director of Marketing
 Jason Haag - Controller
 Sadie Barlow - Integrated Media Director
 Snake Roth - Director of Integrated Production

References

External links
 MARC USA Website

Advertising agencies of the United States
Companies based in Pittsburgh